Milada Spalová (born 16 November 1979 in Přerov), married Milada Bergrová, is a retired Czech volleyball player. She was part of the Czech Republic women's national volleyball team.

Career
Spalová started her career in local club in Přerov before moving to play in nearby Olomouc, where she made an impression and got a call for the national team, participating in the 2001 European Championship and the 2002 World Championship. Between 2003 and 2008 Spalová played in France, Turkey and Poland, winning the championship in both Turkey and Poland, as well as the Polish Cup and Supercup. In 2008 Spalová returned to play in the Czech League for VK Prostějov, with whom she won the league championship and national cup in 2009 and 2010. In 2010 she married Tomáš Berger, adopting the name Milada Bergrová, and continued to play with Prostějov, as the club won two further doubles, eventually retiring in 2012. In 2018 Bergrová returned to play for Extraliga club VK Brno.

Honours
 Turkish championship (1): 2005–06

 Polish championship (1): 2006–07
 Polish Cup (1): 2006–07
 Polish supercup (1): 2006–07

 Czech championship (4): 2008–09, 2009–10, 2010–11, 2011–12
 Czech Cup (4): 2008–09, 2009–10, 2010–11, 2011–12

References

External links

http://www.cev.lu/Competition-Area/PlayerDetails.aspx?TeamID=5320&PlayerID=16868&ID=51

1979 births
Living people
Sportspeople from Přerov